Sotiris Bletsas is an architect and Aromanian language activist from Greece.

In 1995, at an Aromanian festival in Greece, he distributed some EBLUL material about minority languages in Greece. In 2001, on an initiative of the MP for Edessa Evgenios Haïtidis, he was charged with "dissemination of false information" (contrary to article 191 of the Greek Penal Code) who reportedly was supported by the leadership of the Panhellenic Federation of Cultural Associations of Vlachs. The case drew protest from the Greek Helsinki Monitor and from abroad.

He was first found guilty and sentenced to fifteen months in jail, suspended for three years, and fined 500,000 drachmas, however, he successfully  appealed the decision and was subsequently found not guilty on 18 October 2001.

See also
Aromanian language
Human rights in Greece

References

Living people
Greek people of Aromanian descent
Aromanian nationalists
Greek activists
Language activists
Minority rights activists
Year of birth missing (living people)